Thembisa Mdoda Nxumalo (born November 16, 1982) is a South African television personality and actress. Mdoda attended University of the Witwatersrand  and obtained degree in Graphic Design.

Career 
Her career began as newsreader on Wits radio before she left  to work for Highveld After Dark.

In November 2015, she landed on a role of hosting season 6 of Our Perfect Wedding reality television show.

That same year, she portrayed a role of Thabisile Cebekhulu on The Road Mzansi Magic telenova.

She contested on Dancing with the Stars SA in December 2017.

In early February 2018, she bagged a role on hosting Your Next Million television game show. Following month, Mdoda joined Metro FM to host Weekend Breakfast Show with Mo G.

Mdoda landed on a role of portraying Nikiwe Ndlovu on House of Zwide in February 2022.

In June 2022, she landed on a role of hosting Umndende, which is set to premiere on July 23, 2022. She also bagged a role on hosting Suxoka same month.

Filmography

Personal life

Relationships 
Mdoda first met Atandwa Kani in 2004 while attending at the 
University of the Witwatersrand. The couple got married on August 2012 and divorced in 2015.

Achievements

DStv Mzansi Viewers' Choice Awards 

!
|-
|rowspan="2"|2017
|rowspan="2"|Herself
|Ultimate Viewers' Choice Award
|
|rowspan="2"|
|-
|TV Presenter
|
|}

South African Film and Television Awards 

!
|-
|2017
|Herself 
|Best TV Presenter
|
|
|}

South African Style Awards 

!
|-
|2017
|Herself 
|Most Stylish Performing Artist 
|
|

References

External links
 
Thembisa Mdoda as TVSA

1982 births
Living people
South African television presenters
South African women television presenters
University of the Witwatersrand alumni